The Bottom Line (in Slovenian, Pod črto) is Slovenian independent and non-profit online investigative media. It was founded in September 2014.

It is free for readers to access its content and is funded through donations. It has been awarded a Shuttleworth Foundation flash grant and a grant by Open Society Foundations.

References

External links 
 The Bottom Line website

Mass media in Ljubljana
2014 establishments in Slovenia